Preminchi Choodu is a 1965 Indian Telugu-language romantic comedy film directed by P. Pullayya. It stars Akkineni Nageswara Rao, Jaggayya, Rajasree and Kanchana. The film was produced by V. Venkateswarlu. Music was composed by Master Venu. It is a remake of the Tamil film Kadhalikka Neramillai (1964).

Plot 
Buchabbai is a millionaire who has two daughters Kanchanamala and Ratnamala. During their studies, Kanchana falls for a handsome guy Srinivasa Rao / Vasu, the son of another bigshot Subbarayudu. After their return, once, Kanchana and Ratna squabble with Ranga Rao, the assistant manager of their estate. So, they terminate him; hence Ranga declares a strike in front of their house when Ranga and Ratna are smitten.

Parallelly, Varahala Raju son of Buchabbai, is passionate to direct a film for which he daily pesters his father and also loves Meenakshi, daughter of their manager Yedukondalu. Right now, Ranga learns that Buchabbai wants to make a rich alliance with his daughters. So, he plans and disguises his close friend, neither Vasu as his tycoon father Srinivasa Bhupathi, and makes Buchabbai plead for his nuptials with the support of the girls. Besides destiny makes Subbarayudu and Buchabbai childhood friends and they decide to knit Kanchana with Vasu.

At first, Vasu gets startled looking at his father therein but feels happy knowing about his wedding. But unfortunately, their play breaks out, and as a result, Subbarayadu and Buchabbai file a Police complaint. Being aware of it, Ranga makes a Plan B by posing himself as two. Soon, Buchabbai and Subbarayadu rush to amend their mistake, but it is too late as Ranga and Vasu are prisoned. After that, the story takes several comic twists and turns when Ranga and Vasu succeed in marrying their love interests by fooling Buchabbai.

Cast 
 Akkineni Nageswara Rao as Ranga Rao
 Kanchana as  Kanchanamala
 Rajasree as Ratnamala
 Jaggayya as Srinivasa Rao / Vasu
 Relangi as Buchabbai
 Gummadi as Subbarayudu
 Chalam as Varahala Raj Kapoor
 Allu Ramalingaiah as Manager Yedukondalu
 Dr. Sivaramakrishnayya as Veera Naidu
 Raavi Kondala Rao as Master
 K. V. Chalam as Inspector Subba Rao
 Jagga Rao as S.P.
 Santha Kumari as Santhamma
 Girija as Meenakshi / Laila

Production 
The film was a remake of Tamil film Kadhalikka Neramillai (1964), Rajasree reprised her role from the original.

Music 
Music was composed by Master Venu. Pullayya insisted Master Venu to retain the tunes from the original film in Telugu, which Venu was not okay with. He expressed his concern to Pullayya's wife Santhakumari who encouraged him having faith in talent. Except for the song "Vennela Reyi", other songs were retained from the original. "Vennela Reyi" was the replacement for the song "Naalam Naalam". This tune was retained despite Pullayya expressing his anger for using a new tune.

References

External links 
 

1960s Telugu-language films
1965 films
1965 romantic comedy films
Films directed by P. Pullayya
Indian black-and-white films
Indian romantic comedy films
Telugu remakes of Tamil films
Films scored by Master Venu